Merc Fenn Wolfmoor (born June 14, 1986) is an American author of speculative fiction, active in the field since 2007. with some of their early works published as by Abby Rustad or Abby 'Merc' Rustad, and some later works as by Merc Rustad. They changed their name to Merc Fenn Wolfmoor in 2019.

Biography
Merc was born in Minnesota, where they currently reside. They identify as queer, non-binary, aromantic and asexual and have autism, depression and anxiety; they also believe they have attention deficit hyperactivity disorder (ADHD) but were still seeking diagnosis as of 2021. They use they/them pronouns and prefer no honorific, but are okay with Mr. and Mx.

Literary career
Merc's work has appeared in various periodicals, including Apex Magazine, Cicada, Fireside Fiction, Lightspeed, Shimmer Magazine, and Uncanny Magazine, and the anthologies The Best American Science Fiction and Fantasy 2015, The Best American Science Fiction and Fantasy 2017, The Best American Science Fiction and Fantasy 2018, and Nebula Awards Showcase 2018. They are a 2016 Nebula Award finalist.

Bibliography

Collections
 
So You Want to Be a Robot (2017) 
Friends for Robots (2021)
Good Monsters and Friends (2022)

Sun Lords of the Principality series

"Tomorrow When We See the Sun" (2015)
"Brightened Star, Ascending Dawn" (2017)
"Longing for Stars Once Lost" (2017)
"I Sing Against the Silent Sun" (2018) (with Ada Hoffmann)
"With Teeth Unmake the Sun" (2019)

Short fiction
 
"Hangman" (2007) (as Abby 'Merc' Rustad)
"Unpermitted" (2009) (as Abby 'Merc' Rustad)
"The Bastard Saga" (2009) (as Abby Rustad)
"Queen for a Day" (2009) (as Abby 'Merc' Rustad)
"Life, with Side Effects" (2009) (as Abby 'Merc' Rustad)
"And the Teeth" (2010)
"Sheila" (2010)
"With the Sun and the Moon in His Eyes" (2012)
"Thread" (2013)
"Winter Bride" (2014)
"How to Become a Robot in 12 Easy Steps" (2014)
"Goodnight, Raptor" (2014)
"Of Blessed Servitude" (2014)
"To the Monsters, with Love" (2014)
"Finding Home" (2015)
"To the Knife-Cold Stars" (2015)
"Where Monsters Dance" (2015)
"The Sorcerer's Unattainable Gardens" (2015)
"Under Wine-Bright Seas" (2015)
"... Or Be Forever Fallen" (2016)
"The Android's Prehistoric Menagerie" (2016)
"This Is Not a Wardrobe Door" (2016)
"Once I, Rose" (2016)
"Iron Aria" (2016)
"Lonely Robot on a Rocket Ship in Space" (2016)
"The Gentleman of Chaos" (2016)
"What Becomes of the Third-Hearted" (2016)
"For Want of a Heart" (2016)
"Monster Girls Don't Cry" (2017)
"Later, Let's Tear Up the Inner Sanctum" (2017)
"Painting Clouds" (2017)
"A Survival Guide for When You're Trapped in a Black Hole" (2017)
"Batteries for Your Doombot5000 Are Not Included" (2017)
"Fathoms Deep and Fathoms Cold" (2017)
"For Now, Sideways" (2017)
"Thrice Remembered" (2017)
"What the Fires Burn" (2017)
"Two Reflections at Midnight" (2017)
"The House at the End of the Lane Is Dreaming" (2017)
"Mr. Try Again" (2018)
"If We Die Unjustified" (2018)
"Now Watch My Rising" (2018)
"The Sweetness of Honey and Rot" (2018)
"By Claw, by Hand, by Silent Speech" (2018) (with Elsa Sjunneson-Henry)
"The Words of Our Enemies, the Words of Our Hearts" (2018)
"The Frequency of Compassion" (2018)
"Yet So Vain Is Man" (2018)
"Our Aim Is Not to Die" (2019)
"Through Dark and Clearest Glass" (2019)
"The Judith Plague" (2019) 
"Sweet Dreams Are Made of You" (2019)
"Flashlight Man" (2020)
"This Cold Red Dust" (2020)
"Bring the Bones That Sing" (2020)
"Whether the Air, the Void, or the Earth" (2020)
"Gray Skies, Red Wings, Blue Lips, Black Hearts" (2021)
"The Machine is Experiencing Uncertainty" (2021)
"Hexocolypse" (2021)
"Housebot After the Uprising" (2021)
"It Me, Ur Smol" (2021)
"Steadyboi After the Apocalypse" (2021)
"The Loincloth and the Broadsword" (2021)
"The Heaven That They Never Knew" (2022)
"So, You Married Your Arch Nemesis... Again" (2022)

Awards
"How to Become a Robot in 12 Easy Steps" was a finalist for the 2015 James Tiptree Jr. Award. "This Is Not a Wardrobe Door" was nominated for the 2017 Nebula Award for Best Short Story. So You Want to Be a Robot placed seventeenth in the 2018 Locus Poll Award for Best Collection. "I Sing Against the Silent Sun" was a preliminary nominee for the 2018 BSFA Award for Best Short Fiction. "The Sweetness of Honey and Rot" placed thirty-fourth in the 2019 Locus Poll Award for Best Novelette.

References

External links 
 

Living people
American speculative fiction writers
1986 births
People from Ramsey County, Minnesota
Writers from Minnesota
Queer writers
Aromantic people
Asexual non-binary people
People on the autism spectrum
American non-binary writers